Krastyo Gochev (born 30 October 1917) was a Bulgarian equestrian. He competed in two events at the 1952 Summer Olympics.

References

External links
 

1917 births
Possibly living people
Bulgarian male equestrians
Olympic equestrians of Bulgaria
Equestrians at the 1952 Summer Olympics
Place of birth missing (living people)
20th-century Bulgarian people